As the German army retreated during the later stages of the Second World War, many of the urban areas of what is now Poland were severely damaged as a result of military action between the retreating forces of the German Wehrmacht and advancing ones of the Soviet Red Army. Other cities were deliberately destroyed by the German forces.  One of the most famous of these planned destructions was the razing of Warsaw, the capital of Poland. While extensively damaged by the failed Warsaw Ghetto Uprising and Warsaw Uprising, the city later underwent a planned demolition by German forces under order from Adolf Hitler and high officials within the Nazi government. On 17 October 1944, SS chief Heinrich Himmler famously stated, "The city must completely disappear from the surface of the earth and serve only as a transport station for the Wehrmacht."  Before they were stopped by the advancing Red Army, 85% of the city had been taken out.  Warsaw was far from the worst off after the Nazi retreat; 97% of Jasło and 100% of Polanów were reduced to rubble.  Other towns such as Wałcz fared better, with only a quarter of the city being destroyed.  Ancient historical buildings in Polish cities were not spared; for example, Trzemeszno's Romanesque basilica of 1130-45 was burnt down in 1945.

See also
List of former cities of Poland
Planned destruction of Warsaw
Strategic bombing during World War II
Bombing of Wiener Neustadt in World War II

References 
Notes

Bibliography

 - Total pages: 276 
 - Total pages: 127 

World War II, cities damaged in
Polish cities damaged in
Polish cities damaged in
World War II